Scrobipalpula transiens is a moth in the family Gelechiidae. It was described by Povolný in 1987. It is found in Chile.

References

Scrobipalpula
Moths described in 1987
Endemic fauna of Chile